Open access is unrestricted online access to peer-reviewed scholarly research.

Open access may also refer to:

Computing, Internet and communication
 OpenAccess, a common database initiative in electronic design automation
 Open-access network, a horizontally layered network architecture and business model
 Open Access Same-Time Information System, a policy for transmission service
 Open communication, open access to communications infrastructure and services

Other uses
 Open access (economics), non-excludable resources in economics
 Open Access (UK and Ireland TV channels), a set of commercial television channels on the Sky satellite platform operated from the United Kingdom
 Open access (infrastructure), access to infrastructure such as railways
 Open access, in the right of public access to the wilderness
 Open access mission, synonymous for open admissions policies in higher education
Open access (publishing), journals that gives open access to its articles
 An unjuried exhibition or festival
Fringe festival

See also
 Access rights (disambiguation)
 Open source (disambiguation)
 Public access (disambiguation)